This is a list of influential and newsworthy people affiliated with Spring Hill College, a private, Jesuit college in Mobile, Alabama. The list includes professors, staff, graduates, and former students belonging to any of Spring Hill's undergraduate or graduate schools.

Alumni
Nick Bollettieri, 1953 tennis coach.
Eric Campbell, professional basketball player
Philip J. Carey, 1940, Illinois state senator and judge
Jeremiah Denton, career U.S. Navy officer, admiral; held as an American POW during the Vietnam War.  
Olaf Fink, politician and member of the Louisiana State Senate from 1956 to 1972; New Orleans educator.
Patrick J. Geary, medieval historian and professor at the Institute for Advanced Studies.
Mickey Gorka (born 1972), Israeli basketball player and coach
Jim Hendry, executive with the New York Yankees; played baseball while student at Spring Hill.
Alexis Herman, U.S. Secretary of Labor.
Miller Reese Hutchison, 1895, noted inventor of the first electric hearing aid and worked at the Edison Laboratory.
Jo Ann Jenkins, (Class of 1980), CEO American Association of Retired Persons; Chief Operating Officer of the Library of Congress.
Stephen Karopczyc, 1965, U.S. Army first lieutenant awarded the Medal of Honor.
Patricia Krenwinkel, student at the college for less than a semester; went to California and joined "The Family", the followers of the murderer Charles Manson.
Joe Langan, 1951, Alabama state senator, Finance Commissioner for four terms and Mayor of Mobile, Alabama; credited with keeping peace during the civil rights years and forming alliances with black leaders, especially John LeFlore.

Stephen Mallory, Secretary of the Navy for the Confederate States of America.
Dominic Mauncy, 3rd Bishop of Mobile.
Colman McCarthy, leading peace educator, founder of the Center for Teaching Peace, and columnist at The Washington Post.
Samuel D. McEnery, Governor of Louisiana; Louisiana Supreme Court; United States Senator from Louisiana.
Paul Morphy (1855), aged 18 at graduation; considered to have been the strongest chess master of his time, as well as the first recorded chess prodigy in history. In 1957 a centennial monument dedicated to Morphy's 1857 victory in the First American Chess Conference was erected behind Mobile Hall, presented by the Log Cabin National Chess Affiliation (now defunct).
Clemens V. Rault, rear admiral in the United States Navy, dean of Georgetown University School of Dentistry, and chief of the United States Navy Dental Corps from 1932 to 1933 and 1948 to 1950. 
John T. Schuessler, retired chairman of the board, CEO, and president of Wendy's International, Inc.
Todd Schuler (1999), Maryland State Delegate (D).
Joseph A. Sellinger, president of Loyola University Maryland
Blake Stein (2005), baseball pitcher for the Pittsburgh Pirates in the National League.
Dana Veth (2012), professional Bahamian soccer player.
T. Semmes Walmsley, mayor of New Orleans.
Tony Younger (born 1980), American-Israeli basketball player in the Israeli National League

Faculty
 Ann Bedsole, Alabama State Senator of Mobile was a Spring Hill College trustee.
 Magda B. Arnold, psychologist who developed the appraisal theory of emotions; taught at Spring Hill from the early 1970s until retirement in 1975.
Edward Troye, mid-19th century artist; taught French and drawing at the college from 1849 to 1855.

References

Alumni
 
Spring Hill College